The Gila River Broadcasting Corporation (GRBC) is a television network serving the Gila River Indian Community (GRIC) in south-central Arizona, United States. It is owned by the Community through tribal enterprise Gila River Telecommunications.

GRBC broadcasts on two low-power UHF stations near the Community's major population centers: KGRQ-LD (channel 21, previously channel 29) at Stotonic Village and KGRF-LD (channel 21, previously channel 19) at Maricopa Village. Both stations use virtual channel 29.

In addition, Gila River Telecommunications owns two additional stations licensed to the Community, KGRX-LD and KGRY-LD (channels 19 and 28). These stations, broadcasting from South Mountain and built in 2021, do not carry GRBC programming; they are instead broadcast in the ATSC 3.0 (Next Gen TV) format and support Evoca, a forthcoming subscription TV service.

History
GRBC launched in December 2014, 2½ years after the GRIC filed for the new television stations with the FCC. However, when Gila River Telecommunications was founded in 1989, a television station was planned but found to be cost-prohibitive. Its official launch occurred on April 6, 2015.

Programming includes public service announcements and tribal content. Local programming, including news and children's shows, was planned.

Master control for GRBC is located at the Gila River Telecommunications facility on the northern edge of the Community, with a Chandler postal address.

On November 30, 2018, GRBC took a third transmitter, KGRY-LD at Blackwater, silent, as its channel was needed to repack KGRQ. Gila River Telecommunications requested cancellation of KGRY's license on June 5, 2019. It then assigned the call letters KGRY-LD to K28MO-D, a construction permit for a transmitter on South Mountain, and KGRF-LD to the former K19JV-D, a construction permit also at that site.

References

External links

Television stations in Phoenix, Arizona
Television channels and stations established in 2015
Gila River Indian Community
Native American television
2015 establishments in Arizona
First Nations Experience affiliates